"Untouched" is a song by Australian duo the Veronicas, which is featured on their second studio album Hook Me Up (2007). Toby Gad assisted the duo in writing the song and is also the producer. It was released as the second single from the band's album in Australia on 10 December 2007, and the first single in the UK and US.

"Untouched" received generally positive reviews from music critics, which applauded the departure from their previous music, with some highlighting it as the album's standout track and comparing it to the work of Pink and Avril Lavigne. The song was commercially successful worldwide, as the song reached number seventeen on the U.S. Billboard Hot 100, becoming the group's only top twenty there and was known as their breakthrough single. The song also peaked at number eight in the United Kingdom, number two in their native Australia, number nine in New Zealand and at number one in Ireland. The song was certified platinum by Recording Industry Association of America (RIAA), selling over one million shipments there.

An accompanying music video was released for the single, directed by Anthony Rose, where it was shot in Sydney, Australia. The video starts with a lot of pictures in the hallway. The video received generally positive reviews, having over 60 million hits on YouTube. The song was featured in 90210, The Hills and then in Hellcats and also featured in EA Sports game, FIFA 09. The song has also been nominated for different awards, being nominated for Highest Selling Single at the ARIA Music Awards and nominated for Favorite Song at the Nickelodeon Australian Kids' Choice Awards.

Background and composition 
"Untouched" was written by the Veronicas twins Jessica Origliasso and Lisa Origliasso along with Toby Gad, the track's producer. Writing and recording of the song took place at Jessica and Lisa's home in Los Angeles, California. The song relates to Jessica and Lisa's feelings of separation from loved ones. In an interview with Rachel Jones of Female First, Lisa explained the theme of "Untouched": "It's about not physically being able to touch someone or be with them but kind of needing that person".

"Untouched" is an electropop and power pop song set in common time with an energy-filled fast tempo of 176 beats per minute. The song is written in the key of F-sharp minor. The song begins with strings, which are sometimes performed by a real string section in live performances, followed by guitars and synthesized drums. Lisa and Jess's vocal ranges span from A3-E5.

Critical reception 
Ben Norman from About.com said "Untouched" is fast, both in BPM and in the way the twins vocally present the song, yet it proves once again that speed and pain are not mutually exclusive ideas.". K. Ross Hoffman from AllMusic had highlighted the track as an album standout, saying " "Untouched" bursts out of the gate with majestic, menacing string stabs and a driving synth-rock pulse beneath its stuttered verses and breathlessly obsessive refrain." Emily Mackay from NME gave it a positive remark from the album review as she described the song as "raunchy". Evan Sawdey from PopMatters highlighted "Untouched" as a standout, saying "some of the best tracks the girls have ever made, some of which ("Untouched", "Revenge Is Sweeter") even outclass previous high points like Secret Life's flawless anthem "When It All Falls Apart"."

David Balls from Digital Spy gave it three stars out of five. He said "Though it's been knocking about for a while, it's 'Untouched' that The Veronicas are touting as their breakthrough single over here." He concluded saying "There's little in the way of originality here, but the girls' vampish style and quirky charm should work in their favour." He had compared the song to the music of Pink and Avril Lavigne. FemaleFirst.co.uk gave the song four-and-a-half out of five stars, saying "Other than that, this looks set to be an epic dance floor tune over the summer of 2009, it’s definitely finding a place on my iPod that’s for sure!".

Chart performance 
In their native Australia, the song debuted at number four, and rose to its peak of number two a week later. It remained there for three consecutive weeks, and stayed in the top ten for thirteen weeks and in the charts for a total of 29 weeks. It was certified platinum by Australian Recording Industry Association (ARIA) for selling over 70,000 copies there, and ranked at numbers 78 and 21 on the list of the best-selling songs of Australia in 2007 and 2008, respectively. The song debuted at number 34 on the New Zealand Singles Chart and peaked at number nine, charting for a total of 29 weeks. The song was certified gold by the Recording Industry Association of New Zealand (RIANZ), shipping over 7,500 copies there.

"Untouched" made its debut on the US Billboard charts at number 16 on the Bubbling Under Hot 100 Singles chart, but eventually dropped off the charts until the week dated 13 December 2008, when it debuted at number 62 on the Hot 100, due to radio play, and became their first Hot 100 entry. The song entered the top forty two weeks later at number 40, and peaked at number 17 on the week dated 7 February 2009, making it their first and only top 20 hit in the US. It was present on the chart for a total of 20 weeks, spending its final week on the chart at number 81 on the week dated 25 April 2009. The single has since been certified platinum by the Recording Industry Association of America, for sales of over one million units in the US. In neighbouring Canada, the song entered the Canadian Hot 100 at number 68 in June 2008, but dropped to number 88 a week later, and fell off the chart the following week. It re-entered the chart for one week at number 97 in November, but fell off again a week later. For the week dated 20 December 2008, "Untouched" re-entered the Canadian Hot 100 at number 85, climbing to a new peak of 59 the following week. Nine weeks later, it entered the top ten at number eight, becoming the group's first top ten hit there, and peaked at number five in its seventeenth week. It spent a total of two weeks in the top ten, and was present on the chart for 24 weeks.

"Untouched" debuted on the UK Singles Chart at 92. "Untouched" received an "MTV Push" and large amounts of airplay on music channels when it was officially released on 25 May 2009. On 31 May 2009, "Untouched" re-entered the chart at number eight, becoming its British chart peak. It stayed in the top ten for five consecutive weeks. In Ireland, the song initially entered the chart at a lower position, but re-entered the chart at number two in the Irish Singles Chart in the week dated 29 May 2009. After two weeks at number two, in the week dated 12 June 2009 "Untouched" climbed to the top of the Irish Singles Chart, making "Untouched" The Veronicas' first number-one single outside of Australia. It spent one week at number one and eight consecutive weeks in the top ten.

Music video 
The music video for the song was filmed at the Marble Bar in Sydney's Hilton Building and it took eighteen hours to film with fifty extras dressed in gothic glamour. The video starts with a lot of pictures in the hallway. It goes to the band performing with a crowd in front of them. Jess and Lisa are in the hallway singing. They meet a man later. In the chorus, Jess and Lisa perform with the rest of the group. Jess is hanging around with the man and after a while, she goes to get something. The man then sees Lisa walking around in the crowd, and, since they are twins, he thinks that she is Jess. So he follows her and brings her back to the couch where he was sitting. In a little bit, Jess comes back to the couch. She sees that the man is kissing Lisa, and is offended. They see that he is trying to make a move with both of them, so together, they walk away. The music video was released on 3 December 2007 to Australian music channel shows. The video made its debut on MTV's TRL as a first look on 9 July 2008, and a week later made its debut on the countdown at number 10.

Live performance 
The Veronicas performed the song live at the ARIA Music Awards in 2008.

Track listings 

iTunes single
 "Untouched" – 4:14

CD single
 "Untouched" – 4:14
 "Hollywood" – 3:46
 "Hook Me Up" (Tommy Trash remix) – 2:53

iTunes EP "Lost Tracks"
 "Untouched" – 4:14
 "Untouched" (acoustic) – 3:39
 "Hollywood" – 3:46
 "Insomnia" – 3:22
 "Everything" – 3:28

Remixes EP
 "Untouched" (Eddie Amador remix edit) – 4:47
 "Untouched" (Napack - Dangerous Muse remix edit) – 4:52
 "Untouched" (Designers Drugs remix edit) – 4:49
 "Untouched" (Von Doom radio) – 4:07

CD remixes promo
 "Untouched" (Eddie Amador Club remix) – 8:13
 "Untouched" (Eddie Amador Dub) – 7:45
 "Untouched" (Napack - Dangerous Muse remix) – 8:15
 "Untouched" (Napack - Dangerous Muse Dub) – 6:30
 "Untouched" (Von Doom Club mix) – 7:34
 "Untouched" (Von Doom mixshow) – 5:58
 "Untouched" (Designers Drugs remix) – 5:34

Charts

Weekly charts

Year-end charts

Decade-end charts

Certifications

Release history

References 

2007 songs
2007 singles
Irish Singles Chart number-one singles
Song recordings produced by Toby Gad
Songs written by Jessica Origliasso
Songs written by Lisa Origliasso
Songs written by Toby Gad
The Veronicas songs